MOMP or MoMP may refer to:

Places
Mid-Ocean Meeting Point: World War II Allied meeting point south of Iceland

Science and technology
Meanings of minor planets: list explaining the assigned names of minor planets
Mitochondrial outer membrane permeabilization: Process during cellular apoptosis
Major outer membrane protein: protein constituent of the bacterial pathogen Chlamydia trachomatis